The 2005–06 Oddset Ligaen season was the 49th season of ice hockey in Denmark. Nine teams participated in the league, and SønderjyskE Ishockey won the championship.

Regular season

Playoffs

References

External links
Season on Hockeyarchives.info

Dan
2005 in Danish sport
2006 in Danish sport